Rubén Gabriel Ramos Meglioli (born 2 November 1992) is an Argentine racing cyclist, who currently rides for UCI Continental team . In 2018, he won the Argentine National Road Race Championships. His brother Duilio Ramos is also a professional cyclist.

Major results

2012
 2nd Time trial, National Under-23 Road Championships
2013
 1st Stage 7 Giro del Sol San Juan
 3rd Time trial, National Under-23 Road Championships
2014
 2nd Time trial, National Under-23 Road Championships
2016
 10th Overall Tour de Serbie
2017
 6th Overall Tour de Serbie
 10th Overall Tour de Hongrie
2018
 National Road Championships
1st  Road race
2nd Time trial
 2nd Time trial, Pan American Road Championships
 4th Road race, South American Games

References

External links

1992 births
Living people
Argentine male cyclists
Place of birth missing (living people)
Cyclists at the 2019 Pan American Games
Pan American Games competitors for Argentina
21st-century Argentine people